Cyatholipidae is a family of spiders first described by Eugène Simon in 1894. Most live in moist montane forest, though several species, including Scharffia rossi, live in dry savannah regions. They occur in Africa, including Madagascar, New Zealand and Australia, and one species (Pokennips dentipes) in Jamaica. Most members of this family hang beneath sheet webs. Fossil species occur in the Eocene aged Bitterfield and Baltic Ambers, suggesting a wider geographic distribution in the past.

Genera

, the World Spider Catalog accepts the following genera:

Alaranea Griswold, 1997 — Madagascar
Buibui Griswold, 2001 — Africa
Cyatholipus Simon, 1894 — South Africa
Forstera Koçak & Kemal, 2008 — Australia
Hanea Forster, 1988 — New Zealand
Ilisoa Griswold, 1987 — South Africa
Isicabu Griswold, 1987 — Tanzania, South Africa
Kubwa Griswold, 2001 — Tanzania
Lordhowea Griswold, 2001 — Australia
Matilda Forster, 1988 — Australia
Pembatatu Griswold, 2001 — Kenya, Tanzania
Pokennips Griswold, 2001 — South Africa
Scharffia Griswold, 1997 — Tanzania, Kenya, Malawi
Teemenaarus Davies, 1978 — Australia
Tekella Urquhart, 1894 — New Zealand
Tekellatus Wunderlich, 1978 — Australia
Tekelloides Forster, 1988 — New Zealand
Ubacisi Griswold, 2001 — South Africa
Ulwembua Griswold, 1987 — Madagascar, South Africa, Tanzania
Umwani Griswold, 2001 — Malawi, Tanzania
Uvik Griswold, 2001 — Congo, Uganda
Vazaha Griswold, 1997 — Madagascar
Wanzia Griswold, 1998 — Cameroon, Equatorial Guinea

In addition, 5 fossil genera are known.

 †Balticolipus Wunderlich, 2004 (Bitterfield and Baltic Ambers)
 †Cyathosuccinus  Wunderlich, 2004 (Baltic Amber)
 †Erigolipus Wunderlich, 2004 (Baltic Amber)
 †Spinilipus Wunderlich, 1993 (Bitterfield and Baltic Ambers)
 †Succinilipus  Wunderlich, 1993 (Bitterfield and Baltic Ambers)

See also
 List of Cyatholipidae species

References

 

 
Spiders of Africa
Spiders of Australia
Araneomorphae families